is a former Japanese football player.

Playing career
Nakao was born in Kagoshima Prefecture on May 29, 1983. After graduating from high school, he joined J2 League club Ventforet Kofu in 2002. On May 11, he debuted as substitute defender from the 81st minute against Omiya Ardija. However he could only play this match and he left the club end of 2002 season.

Club statistics

References

External links

1983 births
Living people
Association football people from Kagoshima Prefecture
Japanese footballers
J2 League players
Ventforet Kofu players
Association football defenders